Bernardia is a plant genus of the family Euphorbiaceae first described for modern science as a genus in 1754. It is native to North and South America, as well as the West Indies.

Species

Formerly included
moved to other genera (Adelia, Adenophaedra, Garciadelia, Lasiocroton, Tetracoccus (Picrodendraceae))

References

Euphorbiaceae genera
Acalyphoideae